The Priştine Detachment of the Ottoman Empire (Turkish: Priştine Müfrezesi) was one of the Detachments under the command of the Ottoman Vardar Army of the Western Army. It was formed in Priştine (present day: Pristina) area for the defense of Kosovo during the First Balkan War.

Balkan Wars

Order of Battle, October 19, 1912 
On October 19, 1912, the detachment was structured as follows:

Priştine Detachment HQ (Serbian Front, under the command of the Vardar Army of the Western Army)
Redif Infantry Regiments x 2

Sources

Detachment of the Ottoman Empire
Military units and formations of the Ottoman Empire in the Balkan Wars
Ottoman period in the history of Kosovo
Ottoman period in the history of Montenegro
1912 establishments in the Ottoman Empire